Dame Martina Jane Milburn,  (born 1957) is the group chief executive of The Prince's Trust Group in England. Milburn was Chair of the Social Mobility Commission from 2018 to 2020.

Career
Milburn started a career as a journalist, but then worked freelance for a number of charities including CAFOD. She also worked as a researcher on a number of BBC television appeals, including Challenge Anneka from Malawi, Going Live and Blue Peter specials from Jamaica.

In 1993 she became the Chief Executive of the Association of Spinal Injury Research Rehabilitation and Reintegration (ASPIRE) charity for seven years, where she ensured that the Aspire National Training Centre was completed on time and on budget. In July 2000 she became the Chief executive of the BBC Children in Need Appeal.

Prince's Trust

In May 2004 Milburn became Chief executive of The Prince's Trust, succeeding Sir Tom Shebbeare who had been at the Prince's Trust for 16 years. Milburn was appointed Group Chief Executive (covering the UK, Australia, Canada, New Zealand, United States and International) in 2017.

Milburn regularly speaks publicly about the Prince's Trust's work with young people and in August 2008, spoke of how research suggested that young people are creating their own "youth communities" and gangs. At the same time the Prince's Trust was running a campaign, Change the Record, to counter the negative images that the media give about young people. Milburn has also explained how The Prince's Trust's Team programme is part of a joined up package of support which helps three in four young people to achieve positive outcomes. She said about The Prince's Trust Team program in 2008 that "Our great worry was that, on The Prince's Trust Team programme, you took them through the 12 weeks, you built up their expectation and [then] they fell off the cliff face.

When Milburn joined the Prince's Trust in 2004, the charity was helping 41,680 young people a year, and by 2007–08 41,324. During Milburn's time as chief executive the charity has increasingly directed its help to young people who are long term unemployed, and the charity has increasingly measured its success as an organisation by how many young people they have got off the unemployment register, by getting them into some employment, training or education. This figure has risen over four years from 76% to 79%. 

Milburn regularly attends high-profile royal events as the representative of the Prince's Trust.

Media Trust 

Milburn has been a trustee of Media Trust, the UK's leading communications charity, since October 2009.

Personal life
Milburn is the eldest of five sisters. 

She has been married twice, and her current husband Keith works for the Crown Prosecution Service (CPS).

Honours
In the 2012 New Year Honours, Milburn was appointed Commander of the Order of the British Empire (CBE) for services to charity. In the 2017 New Year Honours, she was appointed Dame Commander of the Royal Victorian Order (DCVO) in recognition of her service as chief executive of The Prince's Trust Group.

References

1957 births
Living people
British charity and campaign group workers
Commanders of the Order of the British Empire
Dames Commander of the Royal Victorian Order